Abbie Chatfield (born 20 June 1995) is an Australian radio presenter and television personality best known for her appearances in reality television, her radio show on the Hit Network called Hot Nights With Abbie Chatfield and for serving as a judge on The Masked Singer Australia. Chatfield is also well known for her political activism in progressive politics, which she speaks about on her podcast, "It's A Lot with Abbie Chatfield". She rose to fame as the runner-up on the seventh season of The Bachelor Australia. She later appeared as a contestant on the third season of Bachelor in Paradise Australia.

Chatfield went on to win the seventh season of Network 10's I'm A Celebrity...Get Me Out Of Here! Australia in early 2021, and later that year, appeared as the host of 9 Network's Love Island Afterpart Australia. In 2022, Chatfield landed her own mini TV series as a part of Network 10's pilot showcase called Abbie Chats. She is set to host a new reality series, FBoy Island Australia, on Binge.

Early life and education
Chatfield was born on 20 June 1995. She attended Queensland University of Technology graduating with a bachelor's degree in property economics in 2018.

Career 
Chatfield first gained media attention in 2019 when she was the runner-up on season seven of Network 10's The Bachelor Australia. During her tenure on the show, she received criticism for her outspoken nature and feminist viewpoint. Also in 2019, she launched her podcast It's a Lot, on LISTNR which often appears on top of the Australian iTunes Charts.

In 2020, Chatfield appeared on the third season of Network 10's Bachelor in Paradise Australia, where she was eliminated in episode 2.

In 2021, Chatfield won the seventh season of Network 10's I'm a Celebrity...Get Me Out of Here! for her charity Dementia Australia.

Also in 2021, Chatfield hosted Love Island Afterparty Australia, where she spoke about all the latest drama on going down on Love Island Australia. It is unknown whether she will continue this role in 2022 however it is rumoured that she could replace Sophie Monk as the host of Love Island Australia.for the fourth season.

In January 2022, Chatfield made a viral vaccination rant which was morphed into song called "Ketamine", and it became a Hottest 100 contender.

Also in 2022, Chatfield started hosting her own radio show Hot Nights with Abbie Chatfield that will air nationally on the Hit Network. She also joined the panel on The Masked Singer Australia for the fourth season alongside Mel B, Chrissie Swan and original panelist Dave Hughes.

In May 2022, Chatfield launched her own clothing line Verbose the Label. The brand promotes inclusive sizing and  diverse representation.

In June 2022, Chatfield revealed that she had landed her own TV show as a part of the pilot showcase with Network 10 called Abbie Chats. The show premiered in July 2022. In December 2022, Chatfield was announced as the host of a new reality show on Binge called FBoy Island Australia.

Filmography

Personal life 
Chatfield was in an open relationship with fellow reality television contestant Konrad Bien-Stephens from 2021 after he appeared on the Bachelorette. However, in September 2022, she confirmed that she and Konrad had separated. She is currently living in Brisbane, Queensland.

Chatfield has often spoken about sex positivity and shut down ableism, after sharing news of her ADHD diagnosis.

References

External links
 

1995 births
Living people
Australian radio presenters
Australian women radio presenters
Australian radio personalities
Australian television personalities
Australian women television presenters
I'm a Celebrity...Get Me Out of Here! (Australian TV series) winners